This is a list of properties owned by Simon Property Group, an American property management corporation.

Austria 
Parndorf Designer Outlet

Canada 
Premium Outlet Collection EIA
Premium Outlets Montreal
 Toronto Premium Outlets
 Vancouver Designer Outlet

China 
CityOn Xi'an Shopping Center
CityOn Zhengzhou Shopping Center

France 
Paris-Giverny Designer Outlet
Provence Designer Outlet

Germany 
Ochtrup Designer Outlet

Italy 
La Reggia Designer Outlet
Noventa di Piave Designer Outlet

Japan 
Managed and owned by Mitsubishi Estate Simon, a joint venture between Mitsubishi Estate and Simon Property Group.

Ami Premium Outlets (Yoshiwara)
Gotemba Premium Outlets (Gotemba City)
Kobe-Sanda Premium Outlets (Hyougo-ken)
Rinku Premium Outlets (Izumisano)
Sano Premium Outlets (Sano)
Sendai-Izumi Premium Outlets (Sendai)
Shisui Premium Outlets
Toki Premium Outlets
Tosu Premium Outlets

Korea, Republic of 
A joint venture between Shinsaegae, A Korean department store company and Simon Properties. There are 4 Simon premium outlets in ROK with the first and main outlet in Yeoju.

Busan Premium Outlets
Jeju Premium Center
Paju Premium Outlets
Siheung Premium Outlets
Starfield Anseong
Starfield Hanam
Yeoju Premium Outlets

Malaysia 
Genting Highlands Premium Outlets
Johor Premium Outlets

Mexico 
Premium Outlets Punta Norte
Premium Outlets Querétaro

Netherlands 
Roermond Designer Outlet
Roosendaal Designer Outlet

Spain 
Málaga Designer Outlet

Thailand 
Siam Premium Outlets Bangkok

United Kingdom 
Ashford Designer Outlet
Designer Outlet West Midlands

United States

Alaska 
  Anchorage 5th Avenue Mall

Arizona 
 Arizona Mills
 Phoenix Premium Outlets
 Tucson Premium Outlets

Arkansas 
 McCain Mall

California
 Beverly Center
 Brea Mall
 Camarillo Premium Outlets
 Carlsbad Premium Outlets
 Del Amo Fashion Center
 Desert Hills Premium Outlets
 Fashion Valley Mall
 Folsom Premium Outlets
 The Gardens on El Paseo
 Gilroy Premium Outlets
 Great Mall of the Bay Area
 Las Americas Premium Outlets
 Napa Premium Outlets
 Ontario Mills
 The Outlets at Orange
 Petaluma Village Premium Outlets
 Pismo Beach Premium Outlets
 San Francisco Premium Outlets
 Santa Rosa Plaza
 The Shops at Mission Viejo
 Stanford Shopping Center
 Stoneridge Shopping Center
 Sunvalley Shopping Center
 Vacaville Premium Outlets

Colorado 
 Cherry Creek Shopping Center
 Colorado Mills
 Denver Premium Outlets
 Denver West Village

Connecticut 
 Clinton Premium Outlets
 The Haven
 Westfarms

Delaware
 Dover Mall
 Dover Commons

Florida
 AC Hotel Fort Lauderdale Sawgrass Mills/Sunrise
 AC Hotel Miami Dadeland
 Aventura Mall
 The Avenues
 Brickell City Centre
 Coconut Point
 The Colonnade Outlets at Sawgrass
 Coral Square
 Cordova Mall
 Dadeland Mall
 Dolphin Mall
 Ellenton Premium Outlets
 The Falls
 Florida Keys Outlet Marketplace
 The Florida Mall
 The Gardens Mall
 International Plaza and Bay Street
 The Mall at Millenia
 The Mall at University Town Center
 Miami International Mall
 Orlando International Premium Outlets
 Orlando Outlet Marketplace
 Orlando Vineland Premium Outlets
 Pier Park
 Sawgrass Mills
 Silver Sands Premium Outlets
 St. Augustine Premium Outlets
 St. Johns Town Center
 St. Johns Town Center (Community Center)
 Tampa Premium Outlets
 Town Center at Boca Raton
 Treasure Coast Square
 Tyrone Square Mall
 Waterside Shops

Georgia
 AC Hotel Atlanta Buckhead at Phipps Plaza
 Calhoun Outlet Marketplace
 Lenox Square
 Mall of Georgia
 Nobu Hotel Atlanta
 North Georgia Premium Outlets
 One Phipps Plaza
 Phipps Plaza
 Sugarloaf Mills

Hawaii
 International Market Place
 Waikele Premium Outlets

Illinois
 Chicago Premium Outlets
 Gurnee Mills
 Orland Square Mall
 White Oaks Mall
 Woodfield Mall

Indiana
 Castleton Square
 College Mall
 The Fashion Mall at Keystone
 Greenwood Park Mall
Hamilton Town Center
Indiana Premium Outlets
Lighthouse Place Premium Outlets
The Offices at Circle Centre
Tippecanoe Mall
University Park Mall

Kansas
Towne East Square

Louisiana
Prien Lake Mall

Maine
Kittery Premium Outlets

Maryland
Arundel Mills
Arundel Mills Marketplace
Clarksburg Premium Outlets
Hagerstown Premium Outlets
Queenstown Premium Outlets
St. Charles Towne Center

Massachusetts
Auburn Mall
Burlington Mall
Cape Cod Mall
Copley Place
Lee Premium Outlets
Liberty Tree Mall
Liberty Tree Strip
Northshore Mall
The Offices at Copley Place
Reliant Medical Group - Auburn Office
The Shops at Chestnut Hill
South Shore Plaza
Square One Mall
Wrentham Village Premium Outlets

Michigan
Birch Run Premium Outlets
Briarwood Mall
Great Lakes Crossing Outlets
Twelve Oaks Mall

Minnesota
Albertville Premium Outlets
Homewood Suites by Hilton Edina Minneapolis
Miller Hill Mall
One Southdale Place
Southdale Center
Twin Cities Premium Outlets

Mississippi
Gulfport Premium Outlets

Missouri
Battlefield Mall
Country Club Plaza
Osage Beach Outlet Marketplace
St. Louis Premium Outlets

Nevada
The Forum Shops at Caesars
Las Vegas Premium Outlets North
Las Vegas Premium Outlets South
Meadowood Mall
The Shops at Crystals

New Hampshire
The Mall at Rockingham Park
The Mall of New Hampshire
Merrimack Premium Outlets
Pheasant Lane Mall

New Jersey
Gloucester Premium Outlets
Jackson Premium Outlets
Jersey Shore Premium Outlets
The Mall at Short Hills
Menlo Park Mall
Menlo Park Office Building
The Mills at Jersey Gardens
Newport Centre
Newport Crossing
Newport Plaza
Ocean County Mall
Quaker Bridge Mall
Rockaway Townsquare
The Shops at Riverside

New Mexico
ABQ Uptown

New York
Residence Inn Long Island Garden City
Roosevelt Field
Smith Haven Mall
The Shops at Nanuet
The Westchester
Walt Whitman Shops
Waterloo Premium Outlets
Woodbury Common Premium Outlets

North Carolina
Carolina Premium Outlets
Charlotte Premium Outlets
Concord Mills
SouthPark
The Village at SouthPark

Ohio
Aurora Farms Premium Outlets
Cincinnati Premium Outlets
Summit Mall
Tanger Outlets Columbus

Oklahoma
Penn Square Mall
Woodland Hills Mall

Oregon
Woodburn Premium Outlets

Pennsylvania
Grove City Premium Outlets
King of Prussia
Lehigh Valley Mall
One Oxford Valley
Oxford Valley Mall
Philadelphia Mills
Philadelphia Premium Outlets
Pocono Premium Outlets
Ross Park Mall
South Hills Village
Springfield Mall

Puerto Rico
The Mall of San Juan
Plaza Carolina
Puerto Rico Premium Outlets

South Carolina
Gaffney Outlet Marketplace
Haywood Mall

South Dakota
Empire Mall

Tennessee
The Mall at Green Hills
Opry Mills
West Town Mall
Wolfchase Galleria

Texas
Allen Premium Outlets
Barton Creek Square
Broadway Square Mall
Cielo Vista Mall
The Domain
Firewheel Town Center
The Galleria
Grand Prairie Premium Outlets
Grapevine Mills
Houston Premium Outlets
Katy Mills
La Plaza Mall
Lakeline Mall
Midland Park Mall
North East Mall
The Offices at Clearfork
The Offices at The Domain
Offices at Firewheel Town Center
Parkside at Round Rock
Rio Grande Valley Premium Outlets
Round Rock Premium Outlets
San Marcos Premium Outlets
The Shops at Clearfork
University Park Village
The Westin Austin at The Domain

Utah
City Creek Center

Virginia
Apple Blossom Mall
Fair Oaks Mall
Fashion Centre at Pentagon City
Leesburg Premium Outlets
Metro Tower at Pentagon City
Norfolk Premium Outlets
Potomac Mills
Williamsburg Premium Outlets

Washington
Columbia Center Mall
North Bend Premium Outlets
Northgate Mall
Seattle Premium Outlets
Tacoma Mall

Wisconsin
Bay Park Square<ref
name="Simon"/>
Johnson Creek Premium Outlets
Pleasant Prairie Premium Outlets

References

External links

Simon Property Group